In enzymology, a pyridoxamine-pyruvate transaminase is an enzyme that catalyzes the chemical reaction

pyridoxamine + pyruvate  pyridoxal + L-alanine

Thus, the two substrates of this enzyme are pyridoxamine and pyruvate, whereas its two products are pyridoxal and L-alanine.

This enzyme belongs to the family of transferases, specifically the transaminases, which transfer nitrogenous groups.  The systematic name of this enzyme class is pyridoxamine:pyruvate aminotransferase. This enzyme is also called pyridoxamine-pyruvic transaminase.  This enzyme participates in vitamin B6 metabolism.

References 

 

EC 2.6.1
Enzymes of unknown structure